Skibotn (Kven: Yykeänperä) is a village in Storfjord Municipality in Troms og Finnmark county, Norway. It is located on the southeastern shore of the Lyngen fjord in Northern Norway. The village area is located at the crossroads of the European route E6 and European route E8 highways. Skibotn Chapel is located in the village.

The modern day residents of Skibotn are mostly either descendants of the Kven people and Sami people, or immigrants—and their descendants—from Southern and Central Norway.

Name
The last element is botn means "bottom" (in the sense "the innermost part of a fjord"). The first element probably comes from skip which means "ship" - referring to the harbour here.  The other official names Ivgobahta (Northern Sami) and Yykeänperä (Kven) both refer to the bottom of the fjord off of the Lyngen fjord.  An alternate Kven name is Markkina, but that one is not an official name.  Markkina refer to the market located at Skibotn.

Geography
Skibotn is located in a valley, surrounded by large mountains including Nallagais, Imagais, Steindalsbreen, Balggesvarr, and Storfjellet.  The river Skibotnelva empties into the fjord at Skibotn.  Skibotnelva river flows from the lakes Rihpojávri and Gálggojávri. Skibotn is known for its dry climate with frequent clear skies in the Skibotn valley, and the calcareous pine forests, with rare orchids. Due to the climate with few clouds, there is an astrophysical observatory located in Skibotn.

Notable residents
The well known Sami writer Nils-Aslak Valkeapää lived in Skibotn for a significant part of his life. Leonhard Seppala, the dog sled racing legend, was born in Skibotn. Astrid Båhl, who designed the first official Sámi flag (based on an unofficial flag by Synnøve Persen), also lived in Skibotn.

Media gallery

References

External links 
Nordiclichensociety: About Skibotn valley
University of Tromsø: The rich lichen flora of Skibotn

Storfjord
Villages in Troms